NGC 198 is a spiral galaxy located in the constellation Pisces. It was discovered on December 25, 1790 by William Herschel.

See also 
 Spiral galaxy 
 List of NGC objects (1–1000)
 Pisces (constellation)

References

External links 
 
 
 SEDS

0198
+00-02-107
00414
Unbarred spiral galaxies
Pisces (constellation)
2371
Astronomical objects discovered in 1790

Discoveries by William Herschel